Freedom Fields is an album by Seth Lakeman released twice in 2006. It is his third album as a principal performer. It is named after a park in Plymouth, England, where the Sabbath Day Fight during the Siege of Plymouth is commemorated.

Track listing

First edition
The first edition (first pressing) includes a bonus disc of material. This edition was released 20 March 2006, under Lakeman's former record company, iScream.

Primary disc
"The Charmer" (Seth Lakeman) – 2:33
"Lady of the Sea" (Seth Lakeman) – 3:24
"Childe the Hunter" (traditional/arranged) – 4:18
"The White Hare" (traditional/arranged) – 3:30
"The Colliers" (traditional/arranged) – 3:14
"King and Country" (Seth Lakeman) – 4:27
"The Setting of the Sun" (traditional/arranged) – 4:01
"Take No Rogues" (Seth Lakeman) – 3:55
"1643" (Seth Lakeman) – 3:25
"The Riflemen of War" (Seth Lakeman) – 3:52
"The Band of Gold" (Seth Lakeman) – 3:14
"The Final Lot" (Seth Lakeman) – 1:53

Limited edition bonus disc
The second pressing of the first edition did not contain the bonus disc.

"Lady of the Sea (Live)"
"Ye Mariners All (Live)"

 CD-ROM features
 "Kitty Jay" video
"The White Hare" video
"The White Hare" animation
2004 live tour video

Second edition
This edition was released on 21 August 2006 under Lakeman's new record company, Relentless. There are a number of differences between the first and second editions of the album. The track listing is more or less the same, but with a slightly different order and the addition of the bonus track "Send Yourself Away", from his first album, The Punch Bowl. Two of the tracks, "Lady of the Sea (Hear Her Calling)" and "The White Hare" have been remixed. In addition the second edition does not include the bonus disc and the cover design is different from the previous edition.

The second edition charted at #32 in the UK Top 40 and at #19 in the HMV Album Chart on 29 August 2006.

Second edition track listings
"Lady of the Sea (Hear Her Calling)" (Seth Lakeman) – 3:24 (UK 54 on 14 August 2006)
"Setting of the Sun" (traditional/arranged) – 4:01
"The White Hare (Album Version)" (traditional/arranged) – 3:30
"The Colliers" (traditional/arranged) – 3:14
"King and Country" (Seth Lakeman) – 4:27
"Childe the Hunter" (traditional/arranged) – 4:18
"Take No Rogues" (Seth Lakeman) – 3:55
"1643" (Seth Lakeman) – 3:25
"The Riflemen of War" (Seth Lakeman) – 3:52
"The Charmer" (Seth Lakeman) – 2:33
"The Final Lot" (Seth Lakeman) – 1:53
"The Band of Gold" (Seth Lakeman) – 3:14

 Bonus track  "Send Yourself Away" (inspired by Kathleen Partridge) – 2:45

Subject matter
Many of the songs are based on or inspired by real incidents.

 "The Colliers" : the Gresford Disaster
 "1643" : a battle that year at Plymouth, part of the First English Civil War
 "Riflemen of War" : a 1653 victory in the Anglo-Dutch Wars
 "Childe the Hunter" : The story of Childe the Hunter who died on Dartmoor

Personnel
Main:
Seth Lakeman – vocals, tenor guitar, violin
Ben Nicholls – double bass, electric bass, banjo
Sean Lakeman – guitars , producer, mix engineer
Cormac Byrne – bodhran, percussion, drums
Benji Kirkpatrick – bouzouki, backing vocals

Supporting:
Steve Knightley – vocals
John Jones – vocals
Kathryn Roberts – vocals
Cara Dillon – vocals
DBG – vocals
Bert Cleaver – pipe, tabor
Jonny Crosbie – maracas

References

Seth Lakeman albums
2006 albums